Alston Scott Curtis (born December 26, 1964) is a former American football linebacker who played in the National Football League for three seasons. He played college football at New Hampshire.

Professional career
Jack signed with the Philadelphia Eagles as an undrafted free agent following the 1988 NFL Draft. He saw the field in all 16 games that season. He played the next two seasons with the Denver Broncos, seeing action in 25 games and starting in one. Curtis played in Super Bowl XXIV against the San Francisco 49ers.

References

External links
 Pro Football Archives bio

1964 births
Living people
Sportspeople from Burlington, Vermont
Players of American football from Massachusetts
Players of American football from Vermont
American football linebackers
New Hampshire Wildcats football players
Philadelphia Eagles players
Denver Broncos players
People from Lynnfield, Massachusetts
Sportspeople from Essex County, Massachusetts